Coniothecium is an ascomycete fungus genus.

Species 
 Coniothecium agaves Petr. (1953); Anamorphic Pezizomycotina 
 Coniothecium amentacearum Corda (1837), (= Trimmatostroma salicis); Anamorphic Helotiales
 Coniothecium ampelophloeum Sacc. (1892), (= Coniothyrium ampelopsidis-hederaceae); Anamorphic Leptosphaeria
 Coniothecium anaptychiae Lindau (1908), (= Monodictys anaptychiae); Anamorphic Dothideomycetes
 Coniothecium applanatum Sacc. (1880), (= Phragmotrichum applanatum); Anamorphic Pezizomycotina
 Coniothecium betulinum Corda (1837), (= Trimmatostroma betulinum); Anamorphic Helotiales
 Coniothecium chomatosporum sensu auct. NZ, (= Phoma pomorum); Anamorphic Didymella
 Coniothecium chomatosporum Corda (1837); Anamorphic Pezizomycotina
 Coniothecium complanatum (Nees) Sacc. (1879); Anamorphic Pezizomycotina
 Coniothecium conglutinatum Corda (1837); Anamorphic Pezizomycotina
 Coniothecium crustaceum (Lindner) Neger (1917), (= Sarcinomyces crustaceus); Anamorphic Pezizomycotina
 Coniothecium effusum Corda (1837); Anamorphic Pezizomycotina
 Coniothecium eriodictyonis Dearn. & Barthol. (1929), (= Trimmatostroma eriodictyonis); Anamorphic Helotiales
 Coniothecium erumpens Sacc., Syd. & P. Syd. (1904); Anamorphic Pezizomycotina 
 Coniothecium glumarum Sacc. (1899), (= Blastoconium glumarum); Anamorphic Pezizomycotina 
 Coniothecium graphideorum (Nyl.) Keissl. (1930), (= Milospium graphideorum); Anamorphic Pezizomycotina 
 Coniothecium halimodendri Kravtzev (1961); Anamorphic Pezizomycotina 
 Coniothecium haloxyli Kravtzev (1955); Anamorphic Pezizomycotina 
 Coniothecium kabatii Bres. (1902); Anamorphic Pezizomycotina 
 Coniothecium lichenicola Linds. (1869), (= Sclerococcum sphaerale); Anamorphic Pezizomycotina 
 Coniothecium macowanii Sacc. (1886), (= Teratosphaeria macowanii); Teratosphaeriaceae
 Coniothecium perplexum Peck (1911); Anamorphic Pezizomycotina 
 Coniothecium pertusariicola (Nyl.) Keissl. (1923), (= Laeviomyces pertusariicola); Anamorphic Pezizomycotina 
 Coniothecium punctiforme G. Winter (1885), (= Teratosphaeria macowanii); Teratosphaeriaceae
 Coniothecium questieri Desm. (1857), (= Schiffnerula pulchra); Englerulaceae
 Coniothecium radians Sacc. (1908); Anamorphic Pezizomycotina 
 Coniothecium rhois Sacc. & Trotter (1912); Anamorphic Pezizomycotina 
 Coniothecium richardiae (Mercer) Jauch (1947), (= Phoma richardiae); Anamorphic Didymella 
 Coniothecium silaceum (Fée) Keissl. (1930); Anamorphic Pezizomycotina 
 Coniothecium sphaerale (Ach.) Keissl. (1930), (= Sclerococcum sphaerale); Anamorphic Pezizomycotina 
 Coniothecium viticola Pass. (1888), (= Coniothyrium ampelopsidis-hederaceae); Anamorphic Leptosphaeria

External links 
 Index Fungorum

References 

Ascomycota enigmatic taxa